The Van Buren Place Historic District, located in the West Adams section of Los Angeles, California, is a Historic District listed in the National Register of Historic Places.  The district is located in the 2600 block of Van Buren Place and consists of Craftsman, Shingle-Craftsman and Tudor-Craftsman style homes built between 1903 and 1916.  The area was founded by Percy H. Clark who built six of the homes.  The district is significant, for the purpose of the National Register Historic District designation, in the area of community planning and development and the area of architecture.

See also
List of Registered Historic Places in Los Angeles
West Adams, Los Angeles, California

References

Further reading

  Bob Pool, "This Old House: Former Drug Hub Draws Attention on Tour of Homes," ''Los Angeles Times, page 1

Historic districts in Los Angeles
National Register of Historic Places in Los Angeles
West Adams, Los Angeles
Shingle Style architecture in California
Historic districts on the National Register of Historic Places in California